Dancing Arabs is the 2002 debut novel by Palestinian writer Sayed Kashua of Israel. He is also a screenwriter and columnist, publishing most of his work in Hebrew.

Plot summary 
The novel tells the story of Eyad, an Israeli Arab teenager from Tira who is admitted to an elite bilingual school in Jerusalem. The novel explores his difficulties, divided between his pride in his Palestinian identity and the desire to be a part of Israeli society.

Adaptation 
The novel was adapted as a film, A Borrowed Identity (2014), directed by Eran Riklis. Kashua wrote the screenplay.

References

2002 novels
21st-century Israeli novels
Israeli novels adapted into films
Arab citizens of Israel